Josef Velek ['jozɛf 'ʋɛlɛk], ing. (Master of Arts, Technology) (November 30, 1939 – April 30, 1990) was a Czechoslovak (Czech) journalist, author and environmentalist.

Biography
Velek was born November 30, 1939, in Klínec, Czech Republic.

He began to publish in the sixties, and from 1975 was a member of the editorial staff of the Mladý svět (Young world) weekly. In 1974 he co-founded the Brontosaurus environmentalist movement.  He was considered a founder of the Czechoslovak environment-oriented journalism.

Velek died on April 30, 1990, while scuba diving in the Red Sea.

Published works
Jak jsem bránil přírodu (1980)
Od polderů k Ardenám (1985)
Příběhy pro dvě nohy (1988)
Muž přes plot (1989)

Awards
1990: Global 500 Roll of Honour

References

External links
Josef Velek (in Czech)

 

1939 births
1990 deaths
Czech journalists
Underwater diving deaths
Non-fiction environmental writers
Czechoslovak environmentalists
20th-century journalists